Clifford White (March 22, 1894 – death date unknown) was an American Negro league catcher in the 1910s.

A native of South McAlester, Oklahoma, White made his Negro leagues debut in 1915 with the Chicago American Giants. He went on to play for the Leland Giants the following season.

References

External links
Baseball statistics and player information from Baseball-Reference Black Baseball Stats and Seamheads

1894 births
Year of death missing
Place of death missing
Chicago American Giants players
Leland Giants players
Baseball catchers
Baseball players from Oklahoma
People from McAlester, Oklahoma